Moment of Truth is the second studio album by the American country music artist Suzy Bogguss, released on August 2, 1990, by Liberty Records. The album was preceded by the singles "Under the Gun" and "All Things Made New Again", both of which charted in at No. 72 on the Hot Country Songs chart in the United States. Bogguss produced the album with Jimmy Bowen.

Track listing
 "Under the Gun" (Hugh Prestwood) – 3:02
 "My Side of the Story" (Suzy Bogguss, Doug Crider) – 3:26
 "Moment of Truth" (Steve Bogard, Rick Giles) – 3:25
 "All Things Made New Again" (Dan Seals, Rafe Van Hoy) – 2:44
 "Wild Horses" (Kye Fleming, Verlon Thompson) – 2:47
 "Fear of Flying" (Bogguss, Gary Scruggs) – 3:46
 "As If I Didn't Know" (Hal Bynum, Mel Tillis) – 3:24
 "Blue Days" (Hillary Kanter, Even Stevens) – 3:33
 "Burning Down" (Red Lane, Madeline Stone) – 3:54
 "Friend of Mine" (Bogguss, Franne Golde, Wendy Waldman) - 3:45

Personnel
Suzy Bogguss - vocals
Mike Auldridge - Dobro
Matt Rollings - keyboards
Larry Sasser - steel guitar
Rob Hajacos - fiddle
Barry Tashian - accordion
Steve Gibson, Verlon Thompson - acoustic guitar
Steve Gibson, Dann Huff - electric guitar
Glenn Worf - bass guitar
Rick Marotta - drums
Terry McMillan - percussion
Doug Crider, Lonnie Wilson, Harry Stinson, Dan Seals - background vocals

Production
Producer: Jimmy Bowen, Suzy Bogguss
Engineer: Russ Martin
Distributor: EMI Music Dist.

Charts
Singles - Billboard (North America)

Release details

References 

1990 albums
Suzy Bogguss albums
Liberty Records albums
Albums produced by Jimmy Bowen